Almada, Cova da Piedade, Pragal e Cacilhas is a civil parish in the municipality of Almada, in the Portuguese district of Setúbal. In 2011 there were 49,661 inhabitants in the reconstituted parish.

Architecture

Civic
 António José Gomes Primary School
 Boca do Vento Elevator
 Cacilhas Lighthouse
 Caramujo Milling Factory
 Emídio Navarro Secondary School
 Fountain of Pombal
 Fountain of Largo do Catita
 Manorhouse of the Estate of Santa Rita
 Manorhouse of the Estate of São Miguel
 Modern/Medieval Museum of Almada
 Municipal Council Hall of Almada
 National Tuberculosos Dispensary (IANT) of Almada
 Palace of Cerca
 Residence of António José Gomes
 Residence/Chapel of the Estate of São Lourenço
 Residence Rua da Ermida
 Residence Travessa da Judiaria
 Roman Salt Factory of Cacilhas
 Santa Casa da Misericórdia of Almada (
 Theatre Academia Almadense
 Theatre Incrível Aladense

Religious
 Church of Christ the King
 Church of São Sebastião
 Convent of São Paulo
 Hermitage of Espírito Santo

References

Parishes of Almada